Stjärnorna may refer to:

 "Stjärnorna" (Lena Philipsson song)
 "Stjärnorna" (Marie Bergman and Roger Pontare song) 
 Stjärnorna, the former name of the Swedish speedway team Rospiggarna

See also